Amerila howardi is a moth of the  subfamily Arctiinae. It was described by Elliot Pinhey in 1955. It is found in Tanzania.

References

Endemic fauna of Tanzania
Moths described in 1955
Amerilini
Insects of Tanzania
Moths of Africa